Robert Meiklejohn MacDougal (born March 5, 1977) is a former relief pitcher in professional baseball. He is a switch hitter and throws right-handed. He played in Major League Baseball (MLB) for the Kansas City Royals, Chicago White Sox, Washington Nationals, St. Louis Cardinals and Los Angeles Dodgers.

His pitch selection include a fastball in the 95-98 mph range, a slider, curve, and a changeup used only occasionally.

Amateur career
Born in Las Vegas, Nevada, MacDougal graduated from Mesa High School in Mesa, Arizona, and attended Wake Forest University, where he pitched for the Wake Forest Demon Deacons baseball team. In 1997, he played collegiate summer baseball for the Cotuit Kettleers of the Cape Cod Baseball League, was named a league all-star, and returned to the league in 1998 to play with the Chatham A's.

He was selected in the 22nd round (651st overall) of the 1996 Major League Baseball draft and the 17th round of the 1998 Major League Baseball draft by the Baltimore Orioles, but did not sign on either occasion.

Professional career

Kansas City Royals
Following his senior season at Wake Forest, MacDougal was drafted by the Kansas City Royals in the first round (25th overall) of the 1999 Major League Baseball draft, as a compensation pick from the Boston Red Sox for the signing of José Offerman. He signed on July 1, 1999.

MacDougal made his major league debut as a starting pitcher, but suffered a fractured skull late in the  season when he was struck in the head by a bat that had escaped from the hand of Carlos Beltrán. He lost feeling in his right arm and was unable to pitch for three months. In , the Royals turned him into a closer. That season, he was 3–5 with 27 saves and a 4.08 ERA in 68 relief appearances. He also made the American League All-Star team for the only time in his career.

He lost his job as the Royals' closer to Jeremy Affeldt and spent much of the 2004 season in the minor leagues.

After only about a week after his first appearance of the year, he was traded to the Chicago White Sox for minor-league pitchers Tyler Lumsden and Dan Cortes on July 24, 2006.

Chicago White Sox
The addition of MacDougal was to be a move to bolster the White Sox bullpen as they vied for playoff contention, and while the team ended up missing the playoffs, MacDougal was quite effective in his 25 appearances, going 1–1 with an ERA of 1.80. Combining his appearances with both teams, he finished the year with a 1.55 ERA.

MacDougal's 2006 performance earned him a new three-year, $6.45 million deal with the White Sox on December 8, 2006. However, he was not able to carry his success from the end of the 2006 season into . MacDougal finished the season 2–5 with a 6.80 ERA in 54 relief appearances. He also spent more time on the DL with right-shoulder inflammation, and was also optioned to the Triple-A Charlotte Knights in June due to his struggles.

On April 21, 2009, MacDougal was designated for assignment by the White Sox, and was released on April 29.

Washington Nationals
MacDougal signed a minor league deal with the Washington Nationals on May 3, 2009. On December 12, 2009, MacDougal was non-tendered by the Nationals, making him a free agent.

On February 18, 2010, MacDougal signed a minor league contract with the Florida Marlins with an invite to spring training. He was released on March 23. The next day, MacDougal signed a minor league deal to return to the Nationals. On July 1, 2010, he decided to opt out of his contract to become a free agent.

St. Louis Cardinals
On July 7, 2010, MacDougal signed a minor league deal with the St. Louis Cardinals, making his debut for Triple-A Memphis that night, giving up two runs on two hits in one inning pitched. MacDougal made his Cardinals debut on July 28, 2010, earning the win in a 7–6 victory over the New York Mets. In 17 games with the Cardinals, he was 1–1 with a 7.23 ERA.

Los Angeles Dodgers
On January 28, 2011, he signed a minor league contract with the Los Angeles Dodgers, and made the Major League club to start the season. MacDougal pitched in 69 games with the Dodgers, working 57 innings and had a record of 3–1 and a team-leading 2.05 ERA. He re-signed with the Dodgers after the season for a one-year, $1 million contract that included a 2013 option. He pitched in seven games for the Dodgers in 2012, recording a 7.94 ERA. MacDougal was designated for assignment on May 3, removing him from the 40-man roster. He was released on May 11.

Later career
On May 15, 2012, the Chicago Cubs signed MacDougal to a minor league contract. He pitched in 19 games for the AAA Iowa Cubs, going 1–2 with one save and a 7.85 ERA. On July 11, he was released by the Cubs. On July 29, the Washington Nationals re-signed MacDougal to a minor-league deal. He joined the AAA Syracuse Chiefs, where he had a 1–1 record an ERA of 4.22 in 12 games.

In April 2013, the Cincinnati Reds signed MacDougal to a minor-league deal. He joined the AAA Louisville Bats. He was released by the Reds on June 8, going 0–1 in 17 appearances with the Bats, striking out 20 in  innings with a 5.49 ERA. On June 25, MacDougal signed a deal with the Philadelphia Phillies and reported to Triple-A Lehigh Valley.

The Seattle Mariners signed MacDougal on a minor-league deal on May 10, 2014. He had been pitching for the independent Camden Riversharks.

References

External links
 

1977 births
Living people
Wake Forest Demon Deacons baseball players
Cotuit Kettleers players
Chatham Anglers players
American League All-Stars
Kansas City Royals players
Chicago White Sox players
Washington Nationals players
St. Louis Cardinals players
Los Angeles Dodgers players
Major League Baseball pitchers
Baseball players from Nevada
Spokane Indians players
Wilmington Blue Rocks players
Wichita Wranglers players
Omaha Golden Spikes players
Gulf Coast Royals players
Omaha Royals players
Charlotte Knights players
Louisville Bats players
Syracuse Chiefs players
Memphis Redbirds players
Harrisburg Senators players
Iowa Cubs players
Lehigh Valley IronPigs players
Camden Riversharks players
Tacoma Rainiers players
Mesa High School alumni